"Faded" is a song by British-Norwegian record producer and DJ Alan Walker with vocals provided by Norwegian singer Iselin Solheim. The single was originally set to be released on 25 November 2015, but was postponed to 3 December. The song was highly successful, peaking in the top 10 in most of the countries it charted in, and reached the top spot in more than 10 countries. As of January 2022, it is the 23rd most viewed video on YouTube and also the 14th most viewed music video, with over 3.3 billion views, making it the first EDM track to hit that milestone. "Faded" is also the 48th most streamed song on Spotify as of April 2022, with over 1.5 billion streams.

Walker debuted a live performance of "Faded" with Solheim and string support on 27 February 2016 at the X Games in Oslo. The performance was aired live on Norwegian television.

Background and composition
The song "Faded" is a revamped version of Walker's past composition "Fade", which was released via the record label NoCopyrightSounds in 2014.
Walker was inspired by the music producer Ahrix's sound on his track "Nova" from 2013. In an interview he stated: "The melodies and the way the track progresses are what's so unique and it's what inspired me to create 'Fade' which later on became 'Faded'". The style is inspired by the Norwegian producer K-391. The melody, I don't know where it came from, but I try to let my emotions and feelings have a big influence on the melodies I produce."

While the structure and melody are almost identical to "Fade", "Faded" is noticeably different for its piano intro and outro; with uncredited vocals by Iselin Solheim and mainstream production.

The song is set in common time and has a tempo of 90 beats per minute. It is written in the key of E♭ minor with a chord progression of E♭m–C♭-G♭–D♭.

Chart performance
"Faded" became a worldwide commercial success upon its release, topping Norwegian, Finnish and Swedish singles charts, as well as entering the top 3 in the Danish singles chart.
The song peaked at number one in more than ten countries and in the top 5 in more than 25 countries.

It also charted in various countries including Australia, Austria, Belgium, Canada, France, Germany, Indonesia, Ireland, Italy, Latvia, Malaysia, the Netherlands, New Zealand, Switzerland, Spain, the United Kingdom, and the United States. It also reached number one on the Shazam Worldwide Top 100 Popular Songs in February 2016, and by March 2016, had become the world's most Shazamed song.

Its music video on YouTube reached 1 billion views on 26 March 2017, and has received over 3 billion views to date, making it the 22nd most viewed YouTube video. It is also the 8th most liked YouTube video with over 26 million likes.

Live performances
Several female vocalists have performed the song live: Iselin Solheim, the original vocalist on the recording, Ingrid Helene Håvik (vocalist of Highasakite), Tove Styrke, Alexandra Rotan, Angelina Jordan, Zara Larsson and Torine Michelle.
On 4 November 2017 Alan Walker performed the song live with Against the Current at the 2017 League of Legends World Championship closing ceremony in Beijing.

Music video

A music video was released, featuring Shahab Salehi as the protagonist. It was produced and edited by Bror Bror and directed by Rikkard and Tobias Häggbom; Rikkard Häggbom served as director of photography.

On 24 September 2021, a new music video called Paradise was released on YouTube featuring K-391 and Boy in Space as a collaboration with mobile game PUBG Mobile (PlayerUnknown's Battlegrounds). That music video takes place at the same time as Faded, with it becoming the start of the World of Walker (WoW) Universe, as it uncovers a deeper plot within the previous music video Faded.

Synopsis
The video shows a young man dressed in scruffy clothes and covering his face, roaming with his backpack and a photograph of his home in his hand. He wanders through  devastated high rises and derelict structures in an abandoned town, wielding a flare to explore a dark building. Guided by the photo, he finally locates his home, which lies in ruins. With a final look at his home, he removes his mask, and the video fades to black.

Filming locations

The video was filmed in Estonia at such locations as the Linnahall building; a disused textile manufacturing plant and a concert hall in Tallinn; the former Rummu prison; the Rummu quarry and lake alongside the adjoining spoil tip in Vasalemma Parish; and the city of Paldiski. The last shot features the ruins of a building near the shore on Pakri Peninsula just outside Paldiski, on the outskirts of Laoküla village, Keila Parish.

Acoustic version 

On 11 February 2016, Alan Walker published an acoustic version of the song called "Faded (Restrung)". The song is performed with a piano and strings, with all the EDM elements taken out. Walker wrote in a note to The FADER, that he had decided on an alternative version of "Faded", so as "to highlight other aspects of the song; to present it to another audience who may like Iselin [Solheim]'s voice and the melodies, but can't stand the electronic parts of it."

The music video to "Restrung" features Walker, vocalist Iselin Solheim, and a string ensemble performing in the reactor hall of the dismantled R1, Sweden's first nuclear reactor. The cast wore black hoodies bearing Walker's logo of his stylized initials. The R1 reactor hall is located underground at Sweden's Royal Institute of Technology (KTH) in Stockholm.

The same team who created the video for "Faded", also made the music video for "Restrung" — Bror Bror was the producer, Rikkard and Tobias Häggbom directed, and Shahab Salehi was credited as an assistant. The filming atmosphere closely resembles that of "Faded"; according to a behind the scenes video of the filming, the "Restrung" video was shot as a continuation of sorts to the original "Faded" video.

Track listing

Digital – Single
"Faded" – 3:32
"Faded" (Instrumental) – 3:35

Digital – EP
"Faded" – 3:32
"Faded" (Instrumental) – 3:34
"Faded" (Restrung) – 3:37
"Faded" (Piano Version) – 3:35

Digital – Restrung
"Faded" (Restrung) – 3:37

Digital – Remixes EP
"Faded" (Tiesto's Deep House Remix) – 4:29
"Faded" (Dash Berlin Remix) – 3:35
"Faded" (Tungevaag & Raaban Remix) – 4:11
"Faded" (Y&V Remix) – 4:33
"Faded" (Tiesto's Northern Lights Remix) – 4:10
"Faded" (Luke Christopher Remix) – 3:26

Digital – Remixes
"Faded" (Tiesto's Deep House Remix) – 4:29
"Faded" (Slushii Remix) – 3:31
"Faded" (Young Bombs Remix) – 3:23
"Faded" (Dash Berlin Remix) – 3:35
"Faded" (Tungevaag & Raaban Remix) – 4:11
"Faded" (Y&V Remix) – 4:33
"Faded" (Tiesto's Northern Lights Remix) – 4:10
"Faded" (Luke Christopher Remix) – 3:26

CD single
"Faded" – 3:32
"Faded" (Instrumental) – 3:34
"Faded" (Restrung) – 3:37
"Faded" (Tiësto's Deep House Remix) – 4:29 
"Faded" (Tiёsto's Northern Lights Remix) – 4:10

7-inch
A-side
"Faded" – 3:32
B-side
"Faded" (Instrumental) – 3:35
"Faded" (Restrung) – 3:37

Digital – Remixes II
"Faded" (Slushii Remix) – 3:31
"Faded" (Young Bombs Remix) – 3:22

Digital – Lost Stories Remix
"Faded" (Lost Stories Remix) – 3:31

CD – EP (Japan)
"Faded" – 3:32
"Alone" – 3:34
"Tired" – 3:37
"The Spectre" – 3:11
"Sing Me to Sleep" – 3:11
"Routine" – 2:48
"Faded" (Tiёsto's Northern Lights Remix) – 4:10

Charts

The song was highly successful, peaking between 1 and 20 in most of the countries it charted in, and reached the top spot in more than 10 countries. The only countries where the song peaked between 21 and 40 are Canada and Japan.

Weekly charts

Year-end charts

Decade-end charts

Certifications

Release history

Copyright 
In 2018, Cheetah Mobile removed a level containing this song from Rolling Sky to avoid being copyright claimed. Other levels with Alan Walker songs removed include "The Spectre", "Alone" and "Ignite", as well as remixes of the songs.

See also
List of most-liked YouTube videos
List of most-streamed songs on Spotify
List of most-viewed YouTube videos

References

2015 songs
Number-one singles in Austria
Ultratop 50 Singles (Wallonia) number-one singles
Number-one singles in Finland
SNEP Top Singles number-one singles
Number-one singles in the Commonwealth of Independent States
Number-one singles in Germany
Number-one singles in Hungary
Number-one singles in Italy
Number-one singles in Norway
Number-one singles in Russia
Number-one singles in Spain
Number-one singles in Sweden
Number-one singles in Switzerland
Number-one singles in Poland
Electronic dance music songs
Music videos shot in Estonia
Electropop ballads
Songs written by Alan Walker (music producer)
Songs written by Jesper Borgen
Songs written by Gunnar Greve
2010s ballads
Alan Walker (music producer) songs
Songs written by Mood Melodies
Songs containing the I–V-vi-IV progression
2015 singles